Huperzia appressa (common name, Appalachian firmoss) is a non-flowering plant in the Lycopodiaceae. It has been reported from the United States, Canada, China, Russia, and several European countries. It is a terrestrial plant up to 10 cm tall, with dichotomously branched stems.

Naming history:
Huperzia appressa (Desv.) Á. Löve & D. Löve, Bot. Not. 114: 34. 1961.= Lycopodium selago L. var. appressum Desv., Mém. Soc. Linn. Paris 6(2): 180. 1827

References

appressa
Flora of the United States
Flora of Canada
Flora of China
Flora of Russia
Flora of Norway
Flora of Europe
Plants described in 1827